The 2002 IIHF Asian Oceanic U18 Championship was the 19th and final IIHF Asian Oceanic U18 Championships. It took place between 10 and 15 March 2002 in Auckland, New Zealand. The tournament was won by China, who claimed their second title by defeating all five other nations. Australia and New Zealand finished second and third respectively.

Overview
The 2002 IIHF Asian Oceanic U18 Championship began on 10 March 2002 in Auckland, New Zealand. The first game was played between Chinese Taipei and Mongolia with Mongolia winning the game 5–2. China won the tournament winning all five games against the opposing nations and claimed their second title after first winning the 1988 tournament. Australia finished second, losing only to China in their five games and New Zealand finished third after losing to Australia and China. Thailand, who finished last, also suffered the largest defeat of the tournament against Australia, going down 38–1. Following the tournament all teams were offered entry into Division III of the IIHF World U18 Championship, making the 2002 IIHF Asian Oceanic U18 Championship the final tournament.

Standings

Fixtures
All times local.

Statistics

Scoring leaders

List shows the top ten skaters sorted by points, then goals.
Source: IIHF.com

Leading goaltenders
Only the top five goaltenders, based on save percentage, who have played 40% of their team's minutes are included in this list.
Source: IIHF.com

References

External links
2002 IIHF Asian Oceania U18 Championship at International Ice Hockey Federation

IIHF Asian Oceanic U18 Championships
IIHF Asian Oceanic U18 Championship
International ice hockey competitions hosted by New Zealand
Asian